The Unfortunate Mother is a tragic play by Thomas Nabbes, first published in 1640 (and written sometime prior to that) but not performed until 2013, almost 400 years later.

Publication
The play was published in 1640 "by J.O. for Daniell Frere ... to be sold at the Signe of the Red Bull in Little Britaine", with a dedication to Richard Brathwaite, a stranger to him, whom he apologises for addressing. It is said to have been written as a rival to Shirley's ‘Politician,’ but was never acted, owing to the refusal of the actors to undertake the performance. Three friends (Edward Benlowes, C. G., and R. W.) prefixed commendatory verses by way of consoling the author for the slight thus cast upon him.

Plot and style
The play is a bleak tragedy, beginning in the aftermath of the death of the prince and ending in the deaths of most of the characters.  Its plot includes hidden identities, poison, deceit, Machiavellian social climbing, murder and a duel.  In the preface Nabbes specifies his intent to move away from the bombast and melodrama of popular drama, towards a subtler, more intellectual kind of theatre.  Unfortunately, the theatre companies did not share his ambition and he could find nobody to take charge of producing it.

Characters
Macario, the new Prince
Bonardo, father to Fidelio and Amanda
Corvino, adviser to the Dutchess, machiavel, father to Melissa, supposed father to Notho and Spurio
Notho, a triumphant general, brother to Spurio
Spurio, the Dutchess' favourite, brother to Notho
Fidelio, a courtier, friend to Spurio, in love with Melissa
Beneventi, a courtier, friend to Fidelio
Polemici, a souldier
Vittorio, a souldier
Dutchess Infelice, mother to Macario, widow to the late prince
Amanda, sister to Fidelio, in love with Spurio
Melissa, sister to Spurio, in love with Fidelio
Lady
Cardente, old maid to the Dutchess

Performance history
The play was not performed in its own time, being rejected by all the acting companies Nabbes presented it to. When the theatres were closed under Puritan rule, Nabbes had the script published; it remained untouched and relatively little known throughout the 18th and 19th centuries, and did not receive its first performance until Friday 18 October 2013 (363 years after publication) in a production by Brice Stratford (who also took the part of Notho) at St Giles in the Fields Church, where Nabbes was buried, as part of the Cannibal Valour repertory season of obscure historical theatre.

References

English Renaissance plays
1640 plays